Memorial Hall Library is the public library of Andover, Massachusetts.  The building was built with Italianate styling in 1873 to a design by J. F. Eaton, a longtime associate of the Boston architect Gridley J. F. Bryant. Funding was provided by a number of leading local businessmen, and construction was by the firm of Abbott & Jenkins.  It was designed to house the town library, which it still does, and to act as a memorial to the town's Civil War soldiers.  It was renovated in the 1920s under the direction of architects Coolidge & Carlson, at which time it acquired its Colonial Revival details. Small additions were completed in 1961 and 1968. In 1988 a large addition, which doubled the size of the building, was completed. This was designed by Shepley, Bulfinch, Richardson & Abbott.

The building was listed on the National Register of Historic Places in 1982.

See also
National Register of Historic Places listings in Andover, Massachusetts
National Register of Historic Places listings in Essex County, Massachusetts

External links

 Memorial Hall Library

Library buildings completed in 1873
Libraries on the National Register of Historic Places in Massachusetts
Buildings and structures in Andover, Massachusetts
Libraries in Essex County, Massachusetts
Public libraries in Massachusetts
National Register of Historic Places in Andover, Massachusetts
1873 establishments in Massachusetts